Puran or Pooran is a personal name found independently in South Asia and in Iran. Notable people with this name include:

Given name 
 Puran Appu (1812–1848), Sri Lankan revolutionary
 Puran Bhagat, Punjabi ascetic
 Puran Bhatt, puppeteer from India
 Puran Singh Bundela, Indian politician from Uttar Pradesh
 Pooran Farrokhzad (1933–2016), Iranian writer and encyclopedist
 Puran Chand Joshi (1907–1980), Indian communist politician
 Pooran Chand Joshi, Indian social anthropologist
 Puran Singh Phartyal, Indian politician from Uttarakhand, member of the Bharatiya Janata Party
 Pooran Prakash, Indian politician from Uttar Pradesh
 Puran Rana Tharu, Nepalese politician
 Puran Singh (1881–1931), Punjabi poet, scientist and mystic
 Puran Chand Wadali, Indian Sufi singer and musician

Surname 
 Nicholas Pooran (born 1995), Trinidadian cricketer and limited overs captain of West Indies cricket team

See also 
 Pooran (singer), Persian singer

Indian masculine given names
Iranian given names